Brady Street Historic District is a national historic district in Attica, Fountain County, Indiana. The district encompasses 108 contributing buildings, 9 contributing structures, and 4 contributing objects in a predominantly residential section of Attica.  It developed between about 1840 and 1930, and includes notable examples of Greek Revival, Gothic Revival, and Italian Villa style architecture.  Notable contributing buildings include the Carnegie library (1904), Schlosser House (1840s), Catholic Church (1891) and rectory (1895), McClaflin House (1904), and Greenwood House (1877).

It was listed on the National Register of Historic Places in 1990.

References

Historic districts on the National Register of Historic Places in Indiana
Gothic Revival architecture in Indiana
Greek Revival architecture in Indiana
Italianate architecture in Indiana
Historic districts in Fountain County, Indiana
National Register of Historic Places in Fountain County, Indiana
Houses in Fountain County, Indiana